Somatochlora filosa, the fine-lined emerald, is a species of emerald dragonfly in the family Corduliidae. It is found in North America.

The IUCN conservation status of Somatochlora filosa is "LC", least concern, with no immediate threat to the species' survival. The population is stable. The IUCN status was reviewed in 2017.

References

Further reading

External links

 

Corduliidae
Articles created by Qbugbot
Insects described in 1861